West Mata, located in the far northern portion of the Tofua volcanic arc in Tonga, is an active submarine volcano. It was recently discovered in 2008 along with another group of volcanoes nearby. Compared to the other Mata group volcanoes, West Mata is the most hydrothermally active one and its activity is not disputed. 

The seamount is mostly known for its 2009 eruption, where it erupted pillow lava and tephra into the water from 2 vents.

Geography

West Mata can be found in the northeastern portion of Tonga, in between Fiji and Samoa.

Structure
With data from bathymetric surveys, the structure of the West Mata volcano was made more clear. The West Mata vent has a common structure with most volcanic structures in the area, mostly dominated by a prominent rift zone that extends away from the summit, which is the peak of a conical structure with a circular base on the seafloor. Therefore, meanwhile the northeast and southwest flanks are rugged, the northwest and southeast flanks are rather smooth. This structure can also be seen on the East Mata volcano. The rift zones on the flanks consist of stair-like lava platforms piled on each other. The east-northeast rift zone curves towards the east as it deepens and the west-southwest rift zone is west‐oriented towards its end. The summit area of West Mata is a narrow ridge aligned with those 2 rift zones. There are no structures similar to a crater at the summit although remnants of a former caldera seem to exist. Other conical volcanic features are limited and can only be found on the lower parts of both rift zones.

Geologic setting

The Western Pacific Ocean is filled with a lot of island-arc systems and trenches that come along them. Usually island arcs in this area are claimed to be chains of islands which are detached from continental masses. Between the island-arcs and the continental margins, still liquidated areas of seafloor are exposed out. These areas of seafloor are called back-arc basins. Most back-arc basins are rather shallow regions of ocean crust that are younger than the subducted crust in the adjacent trench. Back-arc basins can be found in between inactive and extinct volcanic arcs and the currently active volcanic island arcs that form as a result of the subduction. The Lau Basin, which West Mata can be found in, is one of the best examples of back-arc basins.

The Lau Basin consists of an area of oceanic crust which separates the now remnant and extinct Lau-Colville Ridge volcanic arc and the Tofua volcanic arc with very active volcanism. The seaward rollback of the Tonga Trench is thought to be the main reason of the diverging action in this region. The basin lies above the westward-dipping seismically active area of subduction were the Pacific Plate slips under the Australian Plate.

West Mata, specifically, is located in the northern part of the Lau Basin which is defined here as the Northeastern Lau Basin. The NE Lau Basin borders several spreading centers on the west including the NE Lau Spreading Center, the Mangatolu Triple Junction and the Fonualei Rift Spreading Center from north to south, respectively. On the northern border of the basin can be found in the area where the Tonga Trench subduction transitions into convergent strike-slip where the direction of the faulting also changes from north–south to northwest–southeast. The rollback of the trench which has also created the back-arc Lau basin created an area of oblique shear that has generated a whole zone of spreading centers and rifts with active hydrothermal vents along the northern boundary. West Mata can be considered one of them.

The NE Lau Basin has one of the highest upper mantle temperatures in the world, has one of Earth's coolest slab thermal parameters which is caused by the speed of convergence of the slab into the crust and its age and has among the highest slab water flux values of any oceanic subduction zone. These factors cause the area's tectonism and volcanism to be complex compared to other places and causes the large amount of volcanic systems that exist in the NE Lau Basin.

Composition

Most volcanic extrusions in the NE Lau Basin region structures usually erupt dacite lavas, some with unusual morphologies, which are quite rare in submarine volcanoes. Other than dacitic lavas, rift zones in the region have been also found to erupt basaltic andesite compositions.

Meanwhile, the Mata volcano group is a bit different, since the main composition of eruptions in the Matas consist of mostly boninite, which is a type of extrusive rock usually seen in the Izu-Bonin Island Arc.

Fauna

West Mata and the surrounding NE Lau Basin is home to many hydrothermal vents, meaning that the area hosts a hydrothermal vent environment, which hosts organisms that use hydrothermal vents to supply their living needs. These environments can be seen in many continental margins around the world.

Hydrothermal ecology
The hydrothermal ecology of the Lau Basin is home to many endemic organisms including the Lamellibrachia columna which shows similarity to Lamellibrachia satsuma that can be found in Japan, Neobrachylepas relica which are a close relative to the Brachylepadomorpha which was extinct since the Miocene and more. In West Mata, these organisms were not observed, pointing to the diversity of the Lau Basin's ecology.
Instead, a hydrothermal environment consisting of three species of polychaete worms, two species of shrimp, three species of crabs and eelpouts was observed. During the eruption of 2008-10 it was observed that there were only large groups of opaepele shrimp on the seamount and the normal hydrothermal vent community was not present.

Activity

The volcano has known to be both hydrothermally and eruptively active in recent history, the most active in between its neighboring volcanoes.

Pre-2008 activity

2008-10 eruption
In November 2008, during a hydrographic survey in the region, an intense hydrothermal plume over the summit of West Mata consisting of high levels of hydrogen and pieces of volcanic glass was detected, which suggested it was likely erupting. Following this event, 6 months later, the 2009 Northeast Lau Response Cruise was led by the NOAA on board the R/V Thomas G. Thompson and carrying ROV Jason to deploy it in the area. During the cruise, 5 dives were executed onto West Mata. In the first dive, an active eruption of glowing molten lava along with explosions were observed at a depth of around  near the summit of the volcano; this eruption site was named Hades. In the rest of the dives, more parts of West Mata were uncovered including the extent of the erupting area of the summit which was discovered to extend  along the summit. The second main vent on the summit was later named Prometheus.

Both vents, Hades and Prometheus, had different eruption styles. Hades was erupting with frequent magma bursts meanwhile Prometheus was showing a rapid degassing eruption. These eruptions both generated broadband signals which were recorded by hydrophones that were set up in the area in 2009.

Landslides
Elevation changes at the flanks of the volcano were observed over the years, pointing out that West Mata has had many landslides at the years of the eruption. These landslides were observed by hydrophones and bathymetric surveys at the area over the years.

Post-2010 activity

It was discovered the same way as the 2010-11 eruption, via bathymetry depth differences and bathymetric surveys.

See also
Niuatahi - another volcano in the Northeastern Lau basin
List of volcanoes in Tonga

References

Sources
 
 
 
 
 
 
 
 
 

Volcanoes of Tonga
Seamounts of the Pacific Ocean
Submarine volcanoes
Active volcanoes